Van Patten is a surname. 

Notable people with the surname include:

 Dick Van Patten (1928–2015), American actor
 Don Van Patten (born 1966), American politician
 Joyce Van Patten (born 1934), American actress
 Philip Van Patten (1852–1918), American socialist activist
 Sarah Van Patten (born 1984), American ballet dancer
 Tim Van Patten (born 1959), American television director, actor, screenwriter, and producer
 Vincent Van Patten (born 1957), American actor and former tour professional tennis player
 William J. Van Patten (1848–1920), American businessman and politician

See also
 John B. Van Petten (1827–1908), Union Army general and New York state senator

Surnames of Dutch origin